Ayyaparaju Palem is a small village in Chimakurthy Mandal, Prakasam district, Andhra Pradesh state, India.

References

Villages in Prakasam district